The Barchiz oil field is an oil field located in Borlești, Neamț County. It was discovered in 2010 and developed by Europa Oil & Gas.

References

Oil fields in Romania
Geography of Neamț County